Merlin James (born 1960 in Cardiff, Wales) is an artist living and working in Glasgow, Scotland.

Life and work

James studied at Central School of Art and Design, London, and the Royal College of Art, London. His college thesis, on French artist Jean Hélion, led to Hélion introducing him to London's Albemarle Gallery and subsequently to James' first solo exhibition there in 1990. James moved from London to Glasgow in 2004.

Of roughly the same generation as the Young British Artists, James is perhaps unusual in making work on the model of the traditional easel picture. It frequently takes the form of small-scale paintings on stretched canvas or polyester, sometimes incorporating artist-made frames. He also makes drawings and prints.

As a critic Merlin James has published widely, including many articles and contributions to books and catalogues. In 2002 he became the first to hold the Alex Katz Visiting Chair in Painting at Cooper Union. In 2007 James represented Wales at the 52nd Venice Biennale.

Notable solo exhibitions

2014 Merlin James – Paintings, Drawings, Prints, Aanant & Zoo, Berlin, Germany
2014 Freestyle, Kunstverein Freiburg, Freiburg im Breisgau, Germany 
2013 Signal Box, KW Institute for Contemporary Art, Berlin, Germany (catalogue) 
2013 Merlin James, Parasol Unit Foundation for Contemporary Art, London, UK (catalogue) 
2012 Merlin James: In The Gallery, Douglas Hyde Gallery, Trinity College, Dublin, Eire
2007 Merlin James, Venice Biennale, 52nd International Art Exhibition, Wales Pavilion, Italy (catalogue) 
2005 Merlin James, Sikkema Jenkins & Co., New York, NY, US
2004 Merlin James: Easel Painting, Talbot Rice Gallery, Edinburgh, Scotland – 40 works covering a 20-year period.
2001 Merlin James, Andrew Mummery Gallery, London, UK 
1996 Merlin James, Kettle's Yard Gallery, Cambridge, England
1995 Poussin's Phocion, National Museum of Wales, Cardiff, Wales

Notable group exhibitions
2013 Inevitable Figuration, Museo Pecci, Prato, Italy
2013 Picture Show, Gallery of Modern Art, Glasgow, Scotland
2010 Long Long Gone, Leo Koenig, New York, NY, USA
2009 Nus, Fortes Valeca, São Paulo, Brazil
2008/9 21: Selections of Contemporary Art from the Brooklyn Museum, Brooklyn Museum, New York, NY, USA
2006 Faces of a Collections, Kunsthalle Mannheim, Germany
2004 The Edge of Real, Whitechapel Art Gallery, London, UK

References

External links
 Artforum review of Merlin James at Galerie Les Filles du Calvaire, by Mara Hoberman
 Painting per se, Lecture delivered by Merlin James at Cooper Union Great Hall, New York, 28 February 2002
 Frieze review of Merlin James at Sikkema Jenkins & Co, by Ara H. Merjian
 Represented by Aanant & Zoo, Berlin
 Represented by Kerlin Gallery, Dublin
 Represented by Sikkema Jenkins & Co, New York
 Represented by Mummery + Schnelle, London

1960 births
Artists from Glasgow
Artists from Cardiff
Alumni of the Central School of Art and Design
Alumni of the Royal College of Art
Living people
Welsh contemporary artists